West Hudson  is the western part of Hudson County, New Jersey comprising the contiguous municipalities of Kearny, Harrison and East Newark, which lies on the peninsula between the Hackensack River and Passaic River.

The Passaic River separates it from Newark and Belleville, and the Hackensack River separates it from Jersey City, the county seat, and Secaucus. Residential and commercial districts, including Arlington, are concentrated along the banks of the Passaic, also site of Kearny Riverbank Park. At Kearny Point there is more industry. Brownfields or protected areas known as the Kearny Meadows or the Kearny Marsh are part of the New Jersey Meadowlands. West Hudson Park is the county park in the area. Arlington Memorial Park cemetery is located on Schuyler Avenue.

The area was known as Meghgectecock (spellings include masgichteu-cunk) by the Hackensack tribe of Lenape people who lived there at the time of European colonization, meaning where May-apples grow, from a moist-woodland perennial that bears edible yellow berries  and used to describe the lobe of land between and before the confluence of the Hackensack and Passaic at Newark Bay. During the 17th century was part of the area called Achter Col by New Netherlanders in the province of New Netherland. It was later given the name New Barbadoes Neck by British colonialists. All of West Hudson was originally part of Essex County under the jurisdiction of Newark. In 1710 it was made part of New Barbadoes Township, and part of Bergen County. The West Hudson municipalities were part of Harrison Township, which was created by an act of the New Jersey Legislature on April 13, 1840, and was part of Hudson County, which had been created from portions of Bergen County on February 22, 1840. The current borders were created through a series of secessions and reincorporations.

The West Hudson towns and Newark, particularly the Ironbound across the Passaic, have had a long tradition of soccer. Kearny's nickname, "Soccer Town, USA" comes from tradition that originated in the mid-1870s, when thousands of Scottish and Irish immigrants settled there after two Scottish companies, Clark Thread Company and Nairn Linoleum, opened. The Newark Portuguese, Clark A.A., Harrison S.C. and West Hudson A.A. were among the many teams. The Red Bulls Stadium is in Harrison.

Portion of the Morris Canal ran through Kearny Point, unused portions which remain today.
The peninsula is crisscrossed with rail passenger and freight rail lines, including those of Amtrak, New Jersey Transit, and PATH, the last of which maintains a station at Harrison (Amtrak and NJT having ceased service there). Also in this area was the former Manhattan Transfer. The Kearny Connection and Waterfront Connection are major passenger rail junctions. The proposed high-speed rail line known as the Gateway Project will traverse the area and includes the replacement of the Portal Bridge and the Sawtooth Bridges.

West Hudson's Saint Patrick's Day Parade passes through the three municipalities.

Since the creation of the 29th Legislative District in the 1970s, the three communities have always been represented in the same district.

See also
List of bridges, tunnels, and cuts in Hudson County, New Jersey
Belleville Turnpike
Gateway Region
County Route 507 (New Jersey)
County Route 508 (New Jersey)
Kearny Connection
Riverbend (Hudson County)
North Hudson
New Jersey Meadowlands
North Jersey Shared Assets Area
Pulaski Skyway

Sources

Regions of New Jersey
New Jersey Meadowlands District
Geography of Hudson County, New Jersey
Neighborhoods in Hudson County, New Jersey
Kearny, New Jersey
Harrison, New Jersey